was a Japanese football player. He played for Japan national team. His brother Akira Matsunaga and Nobuo Matsunaga also played for Japan national team.

Club career
Matsunaga was born in Shizuoka Prefecture on June 25, 1928. After graduating from Waseda University, he played for Hitachi.

National team career
In March 1951, when Matsunaga was a Waseda University student, he was selected Japan national team for Japan team first game after World War II, 1951 Asian Games. At this competition, on March 9, he debuted against Afghanistan.

On March 4, 2013, Matsunaga died of respiratory failure in Setagaya, Tokyo at the age of 84.

National team statistics

Honours
Japan
Asian Games Bronze medal: 1951

References

External links
 
 Japan National Football Team Database

1928 births
2013 deaths
Waseda University alumni
Association football people from Shizuoka Prefecture
Japanese footballers
Japan international footballers
Kashiwa Reysol players
Asian Games medalists in football
Asian Games bronze medalists for Japan
Footballers at the 1951 Asian Games
Medalists at the 1951 Asian Games
Association football forwards